Palaeoworld is a peer-reviewed academic journal with a focus on palaeontology and stratigraphy research in and around China. It was founded in 1991 by the Nanjing Institute of Geology and Palaeontology at the Chinese Academy of Sciences (NIGPAS). The journal has been published quarterly since 2006; prior to 2006, it did not adhere to a fixed publication schedule.

The journal publishes articles from several specialised fields pertaining to palaeobiology and earth science, such as: fossil taxonomy; biostratigraphy, chemostratigraphy, and chronostratigraphy; evolutionary biology; evolutionary ecology; palaeoecology; palaeoclimatology; and molecular palaeontology.

Its editors-in-chief are Shuzhong Shen of the State Key Laboratory of Palaeobiology and Stratigraphy at NIGPAS, and Norman MacLeod of the Natural History Museum, London.

See also
 Paleontological Journal
 List of fossil sites

References

External links
  (Elsevier.com)
  (ScienceDirect)
 
 

Paleontology journals
Publications established in 2006
Elsevier academic journals
English-language journals
Chinese-language journals
Research in China
Quarterly journals